This is a list of historic houses in Massachusetts.

Western Massachusetts

Berkshire County
 Lenox
 The Mount (Lenox) – author Edith Wharton's estate; 1902
 Ventfort Hall (Lenox) – Jacobean style mansion, built 1893 – George & Sarah Morgan (sister of J.P. Morgan)
 Frelinghuysen Morris House and Studio – home of American Abstract Artists George L.K. Morris and Suzy Frelinghuysen; 1930–1941
 Pittsfield
 Arrowhead (Pittsfield) – home of author Herman Melville; built 1780
 Stockbridge
 Chesterwood (Stockbridge) – sculptor Daniel Chester French's home and studio; 1920s
 Merwin House (Stockbridge) – Federal-style house built c. 1825
 The Mission House (Stockbridge) – the first missionary to the Mohegan Indians in Stockbridge; built in 1739
 Naumkeag (Stockbridge) –  44 room, Shingle-style country house designed by Stanford White; 1885
 Elsewhere
 Anthony House (Adams) – birthplace of Susan B. Anthony
 Colonel John Ashley House (Sheffield) – built c. 1735
 Bidwell House Museum (Monterey) – built 1750
 The Folly (Williamstown) – designed by Ulrich Franzen, 1966
 Santarella (Tyringham) – home of sculptor Henry Hudson Kitson

Franklin County
 Deerfield
 Sheldon–Hawks House (Deerfield) – built in 1743
 Greenfield
 Leavitt–Hovey House (Greenfield)  – built in 1799 by architect Asher Benjamin for judge Jonathan Leavitt

Hampden County
 Agawam
 Capt. Charles Leonard House, built in 1805, designed by Asher Benjamin
 Purchase-Ferre House, built in 1764, owned by the Ferre family since 1799
 Thomas and Esther Smith House, built in 1757, example of vernacular Georgian architecture
 Chicopee
 Edward Bellamy House, built in 1852, home of Utopian writer Edward Bellamy
 Thomas D. Page House, c. 1875, used as freemason lodge, 1909–2012
 East Longmeadow
 Elijah Burt House, c. 1720–1740, station of Underground Railroad
 Swetland-Pease House, c. 1793
 Granville
 John and Ruth Rose House, built in 1742
 Hampden
 Laughing Brook Wildlife Sanctuary (Hampden) – home of author Thornton Burgess
 Captain John Porter House, built in 1771 in Agawam
 Thornton W. Burgess House, c. 1780–1784
 Holyoke
 Wistariahurst built in 1868 for William Skinner
 Monson
 Jacob Thompson House, c. 1811–1813, rare example of Federal style with brick ends
 William Norcross House, c. 1785, example of late Georgian architecture
 Southwick
 Laflin-Phelps Homestead, c. 1808–1821, owned by the Phelps family since 1865
 Springfield, Massachusetts
 Mills-Stebbins Villa, built 1849–1851, considered architect Henry Sykes's "best work" in the Italianate style
 Westfield
 Joseph Dewey House, c. 1735
 Octagon House, c. 1858–1864
 West Springfield
 Josiah Day House, built in 1754, oldest known brick saltbox

Hampshire County
 Amherst
 Dickinson Homestead (Amherst) – home of Emily Dickinson
 Strong House, c. 1744, home of the Amherst Historical Society
 Cummington
 William Cullen Bryant Homestead (Cummington) – home of William Cullen Bryant
 Hadley
 Porter–Phelps–Huntington House (Hadley) – built between 1752 and 1799 and home of several generations of important local figures, including diarist Elizabeth Porter Phelps and bishop Frederic Dan Huntington
 Samuel Porter House, 1713
 Northampton
Historic Northampton, a museum of local history in the heart of the Connecticut River Valley of western Massachusetts. Its collection of approximately 50,000 objects and three historic buildings is the repository of Northampton and Connecticut Valley history from the pre-contact era to the present. Historic Northampton constitutes a campus of three contiguous historic houses, all on their original sites. The grounds themselves are part of an original Northampton homelot, laid out in 1654.
 Isaac Damon House (1813), built by architect Isaac Damon, contains Historic Northampton's administrative offices and a Federal era parlor featuring Damon family furnishings and period artifacts. A modern structure, added in 1987, houses the museum and exhibition area. It features changing exhibits and a permanent installation, A Place Called Paradise: The Making of Northampton, Massachusetts, chronicling Northampton history.
 Parsons House (1730) affords an overview of Colonial domestic architecture with its interior walls exposed to reveal evolving structural and decorative changes over more than two and a half centuries.
 Shepherd House (1796) contains artifacts and furnishings from many generations, including exotic souvenirs from the turn-of-the-century travels of Thomas and Edith Shepherd, and reflects one family's changing tastes and values.
 Shepherd Barn contains exhibits of antique farm implements, vehicles and a working blacksmith shop.

Central Massachusetts

Worcester County
 Auburn
 Joseph Stone House – Central Chimney Cape house built c. 1729 35 Stone Street, Auburn.
 Thaddeus Chapin House on Elmwood Street – Federal-style house built on west side of Pakachoag Hill in what is now Auburn.
 Grafton
 Willard House and Clock Museum
 Shrewsbury
 General Artemas Ward House
 Rev. Joseph Sumner House, built in 1797
 Worcester
 Salisbury Mansion – built 1772
 Judge Timothy Paine House – House is known as The Oaks (1774)
 Captain Benjamin Flagg House – Central Chimney Cape house built c. 1717, 136 Plantation Street

Eastern Massachusetts

Essex County
 Amesbury
 Mary Baker Eddy Historic House (Amesbury) – Mary Baker Eddy associations
 Macy–Colby House (Amesbury) – built 1654
 Isaac Morrill House – built 1680
 John Greenleaf Whittier Home (Amesbury) – home of poet John Greenleaf Whittier
 Andover
 Amos Blanchard House (Andover) – house museum; late Federal period
Russell House (Andover) – c. 1805
 Beverly
 John Balch House (Beverly) – one of the oldest surviving timber-framed houses in the United States, built c. 1679
 John Cabot House (Beverly) – one of the first brick structures built in Beverly
 Exercise Conant House (Beverly) (Son of early Cape Ann settler Roger Conant) (Added on to by Reverend John Chipman

 John Hale House (Beverly) – c. 1695
 Long Hill (Beverly) – Ellery Sedgwick's home and gardens; 1925
 Danvers
 Judge Samuel Holten House (Danvers) – c. 1670
 Rebecca Nurse Homestead (Danvers) – hanged for witchcraft, 1692
 General Israel Putnam House (Danvers) – c. 1648, birthplace of Gen. Israel Putnam
 Essex
 Choate House (Essex) – birthplace of Rufus Choate; built c. 1730
 Coffin House (Essex) – Colonial house; c. 1678
 Gloucester
 Beauport, Sleeper–McCann House – built in 1907 as a summer house for designer Henry Davis Sleeper
 Captain Elias Davis House – built in 1804, part of Cape Ann Museum's decorative arts collection.
 Hammond Castle – home and laboratory of John Hays Hammond Jr.; built 1926–1929
 Sargent House Museum – built in 1782, home of writer Judith Sargent Murray and pastor John Murray
White–Ellery House – built in 1710 for Reverend John White, owned by the Ellery family for 200 years
 Ipswich
 John Heard House (Ipswich) – Western and Asian cultures in an atmosphere of the China trade years; built 1795
 John Whipple House (Ipswich) – mid-17th century to the early 18th century
 Ipswich has hundreds of historic houses, including 57–59 that are classified as First Period.
 Newbury and Newburyport
 Cushing House Museum and Garden (Newburyport) – home of shipowner John Newmarch Cushing
 Dole–Little House (Newbury) – c. 1715 of older materials
 Spencer–Peirce–Little Farm (Newbury) – c. 1675–1700
 The Swett–Ilsley House (Newbury) – c. 1670
 North Andover
 The Capt. Timothy Johnson House - c. 1708, First Period Colonial home with historical ties to Indian Raids, the Salem Witch Trials, and The Underground Railroad
 Salem
 Andrew–Safford House was built in 1819
 Bessie Monroe House was built in 1811
 Bowker Place located at144–156 Essex Street and  built in 1830
 Crowninshield–Bentley House (Salem) – c. 1727–1730
 Salem City Hall – Oldest continually run City Hall in America, built in 1837
 Cotting–Smith Assembly House
 Derby House built in 1762
 Francis Cox House built in 1846
 Gardner–Pingree House (Salem) – 1804–1805
 Gedney House (Salem) – c. 1665
 Hamilton Hall – A National Historic Landmark located at 9 Chestnut Street and built in 1805 by Samuel McIntire and added to the National Register of Historic Places in 1970.
 Hawkes House – c. 1780, 1800
 House of the Seven Gables (Salem) – house from the Nathaniel Hawthorne novel of the same name
 John Bertram Mansion located in the McIntyre Historic District, High Style Italianate brick and brownstone mansion built in 1855. When John Bertram died in March 1882, his widow donated their home ( The John Bertram Mansion located at 370 Essex Street ) and this became the Salem Public Library.  The Salem Public Library opened its doors on July 8, 1889, and is in the National Register of Historic Places.
 John Bertram Mansion, built in  1818–19 – Located in the Salem Common Historic District and is a home for the elderly
 John Tucker Daland House (Salem) – 1851–1852
 Joseph Fenno House–Woman's Friend Society, 18th Century – Federal architecture
 Joseph Story House was built in 1811 for U.S. Supreme Court Justice Joseph Story
 Joshua Ward House was built in 1784
 Joseph Winn Jr. House c. 1843
 Narbonne House c. 1675
 Nathaniel Hawthorne Birthplace (Salem) – birthplace of American novelist Nathaniel Hawthorne; built between 1730 and 1745
 Nathaniel Bowditch House (Salem) – home of Nathaniel Bowditch (c. 1805)
 Pedrick Store House c. 1770
 Peirce–Nichols House located at 80 Federal Street, built in 1782
 Phillips Library
 Pickering House (Salem) – c. 1651
 Ropes Mansion (Salem) – late 1720s
 Rufus Choate House is located at 14 Lynde Street and was built in 1787
 Salem Athenaeum
 Shepard Block is a Greek Revival structure was constructed in 1851 and is located at 298-304 Essex Street
 Stephen Phillips House is located at 34 Chestnut Street – c. 1806
 Thomas March Woodbridge House is located at 48 Bridge Street – c. 1809
 John P. Peabody House at 15 Summer Street – built in 1867
 Salem Old Town Hall 1816–17, Federal Style building.
 Quaker Meeting House
 West Cogswell House is a historic set of row houses located at 5–9 Summer Street and built in 1834
 William Pike House, 19th Century
 Witch House (Salem) – c. 1642 – home of Witch Trials Judge Jonathan Corwin
 William Murray House  built in 1688
 Yin Yu Tang House, was built around 1800 in China. 200 years after construction the Yin Yu Tang House was disassembled in China, shipped to America and then reassembled inside the Peabody Essex Museum.
 Swampscott
 Mary Baker Eddy Historic House (Swampscott) – Mary Baker Eddy home (1865–66)
 Sir John Humphreys House (Swampscott) – built by first Deputy Governor of Massachusetts
 Elihu Thomson House (Swampscott) – home of Elihu Thomson
 Elsewhere
 Boardman House (Saugus) – c. 1687
 Brocklebank–Nelson–Beecher House (Georgetown) – c. 1668
 Claflin–Richards House (Wenham) – c. 1690
 Cogswell's Grant  (Essex) – remarkable collectors' house
 Mary Baker Eddy Historic Home (Lynn) – first home owned by Mary Baker Eddy
 Jeremiah Lee Mansion (Marblehead) – 1768
 The Stevens–Coolidge Place (North Andover) – house museum and garden; late Federal period
 John Greenleaf Whittier Homestead (Haverhill) – home of poet John Greenleaf Whittier
 Parson Capen House (Topsfield) – c. 1683

Middlesex County
 Arlington
 Jason Russell House (Arlington) – Bloodiest spot in the Battle of Lexington and Concord; built 1740
 Fowle-Reed-Wyman House (Arlington) - Oldest house in Arlington; c. 1706
 Burlington
 Wyman House (Burlington) – oldest house in Burlington, built c. 1666
 Cambridge
 Cooper–Frost–Austin House (Cambridge) – oldest house in Cambridge; built c. 1681
 Elmwood (Cambridge) – birthplace and home of poet James Russell Lowell; built 1767
 Asa Gray House (Cambridge) – designed by Ithiel Town, home of botanist Asa Gray
 Hooper–Lee–Nichols House (Cambridge) – 2nd oldest house in Cambridge; 1685
 Longfellow House–Washington's Headquarters National Historic Site - built 1759
 Chelmsford
 Barrett–Byam Homestead – (Chelmsford) – prior to 1663
 "Old Chelmsford" Garrison House – (Chelmsford) – prior to 1691
 Concord
 The Old Manse (Concord) – built by Ralph Waldo Emerson's grandfather; Emerson and Nathaniel Hawthorne wrote some of their work in the house; 1770
 Orchard House (Concord) – home of Louisa May Alcott; the novel Little Women was written here
 The Wayside (Concord) –  built circa 1717; later the home of Samuel Whitney, a Minuteman who fought the British regulars at the North Bridge on April 19, 1775; home of Louisa May Alcott and her family 1845–1848; home of Nathaniel Hawthorne and his family 1852–1870; purchased in 1883 by Boston publisher Daniel Lothrop and his wife, author Harriett Lothrop (pen name Margaret Sidney), whose descendants lived in the house until it was acquired by the National Park Service in 1965.
 Bush, Ralph Waldo Emerson House (Concord) – home of Ralph Waldo Emerson
Reuben Brown House – Colonial style built in 1725
Thoreau Birth House—Built by John Wheeler circa 1730; Henry David Thoreau born in the house in 1817; house moved 300 yards to its current location in 1878.
Robbins House—Built circa 1790–1800; home of Caesar Robbins, a formerly enslaved African-American and Revolutionary War veteran. In 1870–71, the house was moved to Bedford Street, near Sleepy Hollow Cemetery. In 2011 it was moved to its present site at 320 Monument Street, across from the Old North Bridge and the Old Manse.
 Lexington
 Hancock–Clarke House (Lexington) – home of the Reverend John Hancock (grandfather of John Hancock, signer of the Declaration of Independence) and the Reverend Jonas Clarke; built between 1698 and 1738 in Lexington, Massachusetts
 Lincoln
 Codman House (Lincoln) – Federal style; built 1735
 Gropius House (Lincoln) – designed by Walter Gropius; 1938
 Hoar Tavern (Lincoln) – Oldest home in Lincoln; built 1680
 Malden
 Cox-Haven House (Malden) –  One of three Stations in Malden that hid Fugitive slaves on the Underground Railroad. The home was also the birthplace of Gilbert Haven Jr. (1821- 1880), the great social reformer and bishop of the Methodist Church. Today located at 35 Clifton St.; built 1790
 Medford
 Grandfather's House (Medford) – original destination from "Over the River and Through the Woods"
 Isaac Royall House (Medford) – a very fine mansion from the early 18th century with New England's only surviving slave quarters
 Peter Tufts House (Medford) – perhaps the oldest all-brick house in the United States
 Lowell
 Whistler House Museum of Art (Lowell) – birthplace of painter James McNeill Whistler
 Natick
Sherman Geissler House – Roger Sherman was a member of the five man drafting committee the "Committee of Five" that wrote the first draft of the Declaration of Independence. In the famous painting by John Trumbull entitled "The Declaration Of Independence" Roger Sherman is depicted literally front and center. He was the only person that signed ALL four great state papers of the United States; The Continental Association, the Declaration of Independence, the Articles of Confederation and the Constitution. He built this house in 1750 in the Bean Hill section of Norwich CT. The house was moved from Norwich, CT to Natick, MA. in 1934
 Henry Wilson Shoe Shop – Henry Wilson, eighteenth Vice President of the United States, made shoes in this ten footer.
 Newton
 Dupee Estate–Mary Baker Eddy Home
 Reginald A. Fessenden House (Newton) – home of technologist Reginald Aubrey Fessenden
 Somerville
 Samuel Gaut House (Somerville) – Italianate style; built 1855
 Stoneham, Massachusetts
 Jonathan Green House (Stoneham) – built c. 1720
 Shoe Shop–Doucette Ten Footer, 1850 ten footer
 Townsend
 Reed Homestead (Townsend) – murals by Rufus Porter, founder of Scientific American
 Stow
 Randall–Hale homestead - built c. 1710
 Sudbury
 Wayside Inn – oldest operating inn in the country, from 1716. Grounds contain one-room schoolhouse associated with the poem Mary Had a Little Lamb.
 Waltham
 Gore Place (Waltham) – brick country estate; built 1806
 Lyman Estate (Waltham) – country estate; built 1793
 Robert Treat Paine Estate (Waltham) – country estate, collaboration of Henry Hobson Richardson and Frederick Law Olmsted; built 1866 and 1884
 Watertown
 Abraham Browne House (Watertown) – c. 1694–1701
 Edmund Fowle House (Watertown) – site of revolutionary government and first US treaty; early 1740s
 Woburn
 1790 House (Woburn) – large Federal house with interesting history; 1790
 Baldwin House (Woburn) – home of engineer Col. Loammi Baldwin; 1661
 Benjamin Thompson House–Count Rumford Birthplace (Woburn) – birthplace of Benjamin Thompson, also known as Count Rumford

Norfolk County
 Quincy
 John Adams Birthplace (Quincy) – birthplace of John Adams
 John Quincy Adams Birthplace  (Quincy) – birthplace of John Quincy Adams
 The Josiah Quincy House (Quincy) – country home of Revolutionary War soldier Colonel Josiah Quincy;1770
 Peacefield (Quincy) – home of several generations of the Adams family
 Brookline
 John F. Kennedy National Historic Site, the birthplace of JFK
 George R. Minot House (Brookline) – home of George R. Minot
 Dedham
 Endicott Estate Dedham, Massachusetts – home of Henry B. Endicott, designed by Henry Bailey Alden, 1905
 Endicott House Dedham, Massachusetts – home of H. Wendell Endicott, designed by Charles A. Platt with landscape by Frederick Law Olmsted, 1934
 Fairbanks House (Dedham) – North America's oldest surviving timber-frame house; built c. 1641
 Needham
 Jarvis Thorpe House (Needham) – Built in 1836, served as Needham's Post Office as well as home to the influential Thorpe family.
 Elsewhere
 Captain Robert Bennet Forbes House (Milton) – Greek Revival architecture
 Eleanor Cabot Bradley Estate (Canton) – country house with garden grounds
 General Sylvanus Thayer Birthplace (Braintree) – birthplace of Sylvanus Thayer, "Father of West Point"

Suffolk County
 Boston
First Harrison Gray Otis House (Boston) – by Charles Bulfinch
 Second Harrison Gray Otis House (Boston) – by Charles Bulfinch
 Third Harrison Gray Otis House (Boston) – by Charles Bulfinch
 Amory–Ticknor House (Boston) by Charles Bulfinch
 Isabella Stewart Gardner Museum (Boston) – Remarkable palazzo and art museum
 Gibson House Museum (Boston) – unchanged Back Bay townhouse lived in by 3 generations of Gibsons; built 1859
 Paul Revere House (Boston) – built in 1680
 Pierce–Hichborn House (Boston) – an early Georgian house; 1711
Nichols House Museum (Boston) - by Charles Bulfinch
 Dorchester
 James Blake House (Dorchester) – oldest house in Boston; 1648
 Captain Lemuel Clap House (Dorchester) – built for a descendant of an original settler; 1710 and 1765
 William Clapp House (Dorchester) – Federal style with Greek Revival addition; 1806
 Pierce House (Dorchester, Massachusetts) - First period house; c. 1683
 Roxbury
 William Lloyd Garrison House (Roxbury) – William Lloyd Garrison's home
 Shirley–Eustis House (Roxbury) – Tory stronghold
 Edward Everett Hale House (Roxbury)- Home of famed author and minister Edward Everett Hale; 1841
 Elsewhere
 Loring–Greenough House (Jamaica Plain) – Tory stronghold
 Ellen Swallow Richards House (Jamaica Plain) – home of Ellen Swallow Richards

Southeastern Massachusetts

Bristol County
 Dartmouth
 Elihu Akin House – cape-style house built; built in 1762
 Fall River
 David M. Anthony House – Second Empire style, built 1875
 Ariadne J. and Mary A. Borden House – Second Empire, built 1882
 Borden–Winslow House – Georgian Colonial, built 1740
 Lafayette–Durfee House – Georgian Colonial, built about 1750
 William Lindsey House – Greek Revival, built 1844
 Luther Winslow Jr. House – Federal, built 1875
 Osborn House – Greek Revival, built 1843
 Mansfield
Fisher-Richardson House - built 1743
New Bedford
Rotch–Jones–Duff House and Garden Museum – home of William Rotch Jr., a whaling merchant; built in 1834
 Rehoboth
 Christopher Carpenter House – built 1800
 Col. Thomas Carpenter III House – built 1855
 Carpenter House (Rehoboth, Massachusetts) – built 1789
 Taunton
 J.C. Bartlett House – built, 1880
 Samuel Colby House – Italianate, built 1869
 McKinstrey House – Georgian colonial, built 1759
 Morse House – built 1850
 William L. White Jr. House – Second Empire, built 1873

Plymouth County
 Duxbury
 Alden House Historic Site (Duxbury) – purportedly built by the Pilgrim John Alden; originally thought built in 1653, though later evidence suggests c. 1700
 King Caesar House (Duxbury) – home of Ezra Weston, II ("King Caesar"); built 1808
 Nathaniel Winsor Jr. House (Duxbury) – built 1807
 Plymouth
 Harlow Old Fort House (Plymouth) – built with timbers from the Pilgrims 1621 Fort on Burial Hill; built in 1677
 The Jabez Howland House (Plymouth) – home of Mayflower passenger John Howland; built in 1667
 Richard Sparrow House (Plymouth) – oldest house in Plymouth; owned by the Sparrow family, who arrived Plymouth in 1633; the house was built c. 1640
 Hingham
 Samuel Lincoln House (Hingham) – built by Samuel Lincoln 1721 on land purchased in 1649 by grandfather Samuel Lincoln, ancestor of President Abraham Lincoln
 Elsewhere
 Isaac Winslow House (Marshfield) – Tory stronghold
 Old Oaken Bucket Homestead (Scituate) – scene of Samuel Woodworth's poem "The Old Oaken Bucket"
Daniel Webster Estate  (Marshfield, Massachusetts) – site of Webster Law Office and Webster Family home

Cape Cod and the islands

Barnstable County
 Atwood House Museum, Chatham – built 1756
 Isaac Crocker Homestead, Marstons Mills – built c. 1750s
 Winslow Crocker House, Yarmouth Port – built c. 1780
 Hoxie House, Sandwich – Cape Cod's oldest saltbox house; built c. 1675
 Wing Fort House, East Sandwich, Massachusetts – built ca. 1641

Dukes County
 The Vincent House, Martha's Vineyard – oldest house in Martha's Vineyard; built c. 1672
 The Thomas Chase House, Martha's Vineyard – oldest house in downtown Vineyard Haven; built c. 1717

Nantucket County
 Auld Lang Syne House, Nantucket Sconset – oldest house in Nantucket not on the original foundation, ca. 1675
 Jethro Coffin House, Nantucket – oldest house in Nantucket on its original foundation; built c. 1686

See also 
 Historic New England
 The Trustees of Reservations
 List of National Historic Landmarks in Massachusetts
 List of the oldest buildings in Massachusetts
 List of Registered Historic Places in Massachusetts

References 

 
Historic houses